The King's Cup was a series of invitational snooker tournaments staged in Bangkok, Thailand between 1990 and 1994, and was an event made for television in Thailand and held in the studios of their Channel 9 station just before Christmas. Sixteen players were invited, mostly Asian, and they were split into four groups of three with four players exempted until the quarter finals where they joined the group winners.

Winners

References

King's Cup (snooker)
Snooker non-ranking competitions
Recurring sporting events established in 1991
Recurring events disestablished in 1994
Defunct snooker competitions